The Yinwum, also written Jinwum, were an indigenous Australian people of the Cape York Peninsula of Queensland.

Country
The Yinwum's native lands covered an extent estimated at  about the Upper Wenlock river (Batavia) River south of Moreton Telegraph Station. The Nyuwathai were to their north; the Koko-Yao to their east; the Mbewum and Wikampama to their southwest, while the Ndwangit horde of the Winduwinda lay to their west, over the Cox river.

Alternative names
 Jinwum.
 Yeemwoon.

Notes

Citations

Sources

Aboriginal peoples of Queensland